Abia is one of a number of places in Nigeria with this name.  This is the one in eastern Nigeria.

Transport 

Abia is served by a station on the eastern mainline of the national railway system.

Abia is proposed to receive a Dry port.

See also 

 Railway stations in Nigeria

References 

Populated places in Abia State